Christopher Tancred (8 April 1659 – 22 November 1705), of Whixley in Yorkshire, was Member of Parliament for Aldborough from 1689 to 1698.

He also served as High Sheriff of Yorkshire in 1684 and Master of the Harriers to King William III.

His son Christopher Tancred (1689–1754) succeeded him as lord of the manor of Whixley.

References

Notes

1659 births
1705 deaths
High Sheriffs of Yorkshire
English MPs 1689–1690
English MPs 1690–1695
English MPs 1695–1698